Mirza Aqil Hussain Barlas (29 July 1927 – 21 December 1989) was a lawyer and diplomat, known for his translations from Persian. He was in charge of the Egyptian Embassy in New Delhi India.

Background
Nawab Mirza Aqil Hussain Barlas was a direct descendant of Nawab Qasim Jan, the eponym of Gali Qasim Jan and Qasim Khani Mosque in Ballimaran, New Delhi.

His father was Nawab Shakir Hussain Barlas, a barrister from Oxford University, England, and his mother was Bibi Mehmooda Begum, the sister of Sirdar Ikbal Ali Shah.

He produced an English translation of the first part of the Bostan of Saadi of Shiraz, published in London by the Octagon Press (the publishing firm of his cousin Idries Shah, the son of Sirdar Ikbal Ali Shah and grandson of Nawab Syed Amjad Ali Shah). Idries Shah recounts a story about his cousin in his book Kara Kush (in the chapter 'Mirza in a mulberry tree').

His only child was Adil Hussain Barlas. He died of heart failure in the Govind Ballabh Pant hospital in New Delhi, and was buried in the family graveyard in Nizamuddin Aulia Dargah.

References

Nawabs of India
1927 births
1989 deaths
History of Delhi
People from Delhi